Charles John ffoulkes (1868–1947) was a British historian, and curator of the Royal Armouries at London. He was a younger son of the Reverend Edmund ffoulkes. He wrote extensively on medieval arms and armour.

ffoulkes was selected as the Curator of the Armouries by his predecessor, Harold Arthur Lee-Dillon, and assumed the office on 1 January 1913.

He played an important role in the British Arts and Crafts movement, and was an acquaintance of William Morris.

He was subsequently first curator and secretary of the newly formed Imperial War Museum in London.

His wife Maude Mary Chester ffoulkes née Craven (1871-1949) was a ghostwriter.

Published works 
 (1909) Armour and Weapons, Oxford: Clarendon Press; republished by Westholme Publishing, 2005 
 (1912) The Armourer and His Craft, London: Methuen; republished by Dover, 1988 
 (1930) The 'Dardanelles' Gun at the Tower

References

External links
 
 
 Royal Armouries biography

 

British historians
British curators
1868 births
1947 deaths
Historians of weapons